The 1993 PBA All-Filipino Cup Finals was the best-of-7 championship series of the 1993 PBA All-Filipino Cup, and the conclusion of the conference playoffs. The San Miguel Beermen and Coney Island Ice Cream Stars played for the 54th championship contested by the league.

Coney Island Ice Cream Stars wins their third PBA title in a 4–2 series victory over the San Miguel Beermen.

Qualification

Series scoring summary

Games summary

Game 1

The Ice Cream Stars led by 13 points, 52–39 in the second quarter and settled for a 54–47 halftime lead. The Beermen opened the third quarter with eight straight points and grab the upper hand, 55–54. The Stars fought the Beermen throughout the fourth period until Allan Caidic buried a triple that broke an 83-all standoff and started an 11–2 run by San Miguel with Samboy Lim blocking Jerry Codinera's shot and Ato Agustin scoring underneath to give them a 94–85 lead. Coney Island coach Chot Reyes then pulled his starters in dismay.

Game 2

Coney Island raced to a 16-point lead at halftime, 57–41. The Beermen rallied to within a point, 84–85 in the final quarter, a jumper by Alvin Patrimonio and a tip-in by Abe King bailed the stars out of trouble with time down to 3:54, the Stars on top, 97–92. Abe King accounted for a crucial three offensive rebounds to snap whatever momentum the Beermen had.

Game 3

Alvin Patrimonio scored 14 of his 29 points in the third quarter as the Stars opened leads of as many as 13 points, 75–62, Patrimonio teamed up with Jerry Codiñera and Glenn Capacio at endgame to repulse numerous rallies by the Beermen, which threatened for the last time at 85–88. Patrimonio single-handedly do it all for Coney Island and scored often on double or triple-teaming defense thrown at him and was unstoppable for the night.

Game 4

San Miguel had their biggest lead at 64–48 when a 19–2 run by the Stars, behind Alvin Patrimonio, Boy Cabahug and Jerry Codinera, seized the upper hand for Coney Island at 67–66. In the final quarter, the Beermen were protecting a three-point edge, 95–92, when four straight points by the Stars with Alvin Patrimonio converting on the game's final basket with still two minutes left. Ramon Fernandez missed two crucial free throws and as time was winding down, Yves Dignadice forces a turnover on Patrimonio and a final possession for the Beermen, Ato Agustin missed on a side jumper as time expired.

Game 5

The Beermen went up by 15 points, 67–52 in the third quarter when the Stars came back again with a 9–0 run, ignited by a three-pointer from Boy Cabahug. Twice the Ice Cream Stars close to within six points, the last at 63–69, Samboy Lim hit a long three-pointer from midcourt as the buzzer sounded ending the third quarter for San Miguel at 72–63 and stopped the furious rally of Coney Island. The Beermen then scored seven straight points at the start of the fourth period and began pulling away.

Game 6

The Beermen took a huge 18-point lead, 27–9 in the first quarter, the Ice Cream Stars were able to cut the deficit down to four points, 35–39 in the second period but fell again in the third quarter as San Miguel looks set to extend the series into a seventh game after leading by 15 points, 84–69 in the fourth quarter, a 10–0 blast by Coney Island close the gap to within five, after Alvin Patrimonio's shot was nullified by the referee and Hector Calma of San Miguel completing a layup, Patrimonio orchestrated another 7–0 attack by the Stars to tie the count at 86-all. The game went into overtime at 90-all on Boy Cabahug's jumper with five seconds to go in regulation.

In the extension period, Patrimonio gave the Stars their first taste of the lead and Dindo Pumaren's fastbreak layup opened a four-point cushion, 98–94 with only 30 seconds left. The Beermen had a chance to tie again after converting two points and an error by the Stars but they failed to execute on the return play, Boy Cabahug was fouled with three seconds left, sinking his first charity but missed the second, the Beermen could not make a final attempt as time expired.

Rosters

Broadcast notes

References

External links
PBA official website

1993 PBA season
1993
San Miguel Beermen games
Magnolia Hotshots games
PBA All-Filipino Cup Finals